Prock may refer to:

 Markus Prock (born 1964), an Austrian luger awarded several Olympic medals
 "Prock" Awesome, the main character in Hulu's animated comedy series The Awesomes
 Christian Leberecht von Prøck, Governor-General of the Dutch West Indies from 1756 to 1766
 Prock, another name for the folkloric sidehill gouger